Natasza Górnicka (born 16 July 1989) is a Polish footballer who plays as a defender for Górnik Łęczna. She has appeared for the Poland women's national team.

Career
Górnicka has been capped for the Poland national team, appearing for the team during the 2019 FIFA Women's World Cup qualifying cycle.

References

External links
 
 
 

1989 births
Living people
Polish women's footballers
Poland women's international footballers
Women's association football defenders